List table of the properties and districts — listed on the California Historical Landmarks — within Fresno County, Northern California. 

Note: Click the "Map of all coordinates" link to the right to view a Google map of all properties and districts with latitude and longitude coordinates in the table below.

Listings

|}

References

See also

List of California Historical Landmarks
National Register of Historic Places listings in Fresno County, California

  
 

 
. 
List of California Historical Landmarks
.
L01
Protected areas of Fresno County, California
Fresno County, California
History of the San Joaquin Valley